Sriperumbudur is a town panchayat in the Kanchipuram district of the Indian state of Tamil Nadu. It is located 40 kilometers southwest of the capital city of Chennai on the National Highway 4 and is just outside the Chennai Metropolitan Area and part of the Chennai suburban area. It is a fast emerging neighbourhood of Chennai. Since 2000, Sriperumbudur has seen rapid industrialisation. It is known for being the birthplace of Sri Ramanuja, one of the most prominent Hindu Vaishnava saints. The former Indian Prime Minister Rajiv Gandhi was assassinated here in 1991.

Geography

Geology
Sriperumbudur belongs to the Sriperumbudur Formation, which is characterised by arenaceous and argillaceous rock units composed of splintery green shale, clays, and sandstones with ironstone intercalation. The rock units conformably overlie either the Precambrian basement or Precambrian boulder beds and green shales. The beds contain marine intercalations. Their lithologic suites and fossil fauna are suggestive of deposition under shallow and brackish conditions, probably close to the shoreline.

Economy

Sriperumbudur has attracted huge investments due to several factors:

 proximity to Chennai port
 strategic location on the Chennai-Bangalore highway
 infrastructure development
 establishment of Software Technology Parks
 availability of quality workforce

In 1999, Hyundai, one of the initial investors, arrived at Sriperumbudur.  By 2008, Sriperumbudur had become a special economic zone with over US$2 billion invested by companies primarily in the automotive and electronics sectors.

A new greenfield Chennai Airport is planned for Sriperumbudur.  The Industrial corridor between Sriperumbudur and Oragadam is rapidly growing with apartment complexes by large developers such as KumarRaja Foundations, Arun Excello and Hiranandani.

Companies in Sriperumbudur 
The following companies have established operations in Sriperumbudur:

BMW
AIS Glass - Automotive Glass
CAPARO engineering India Ltd.
Dell
DELL
Flextronics
Ford
Foxconn
Jabil
Lenovo
Mitsubishi
Motorola
Nissan
Royal Enfield
Saint-Gobain
Salcomp
Samsung
Sanmina-SCI
YAMAHA motors Pvt ltd.
YCH

Government and politics
The Sriperumbudur assembly constituency is one of 234 constituencies represented in Tamil Nadu's State Legislative assembly. It is also represented as Sriperumbudur Lok Sabha Constituency in Lok Sabha, the lower house of the Indian Parliament. The current Member of Parliament from the constituency is T R Baalu from the Dravida Munnetra Kazhagam (DMK).

The Kanchipuram Regional Transport Office (RTO) has a unit office in Sriperumbudur.

Places of interest

Adikesava Perumal temple
Adikesava Perumal Temple is the birthplace of Ramanuja, the Hindu saint and philosopher known as the proponents of the Vaishnavism branch of Hinduism. Ramanujar's vigraha (statue) was installed in this temple during the saint's lifetime and is, therefore, called "Thamugantha Thirumani" (literally, "cherished by himself form").

Rajiv Gandhi Memorial
The Rajiv Gandhi Memorial is a memorial to former Indian prime minister Rajiv Gandhi at the site where he was assassinated. The Memorial was dedicated to the nation by the then President of India Dr. A. P. J. Abdul Kalam in 2003.

Vallakottai Murugan temple
Vallakottai Murugan temple, 9 km from Sriperumbudur, is known for the tallest Lord Murugan statue in India.

Madras Motor Sports Club
Madras Motor Sports Club, located at the village of Irungattukottai near Sriperumbudur, organises world class racing events every year, including the South India Rally and the All India Motor Race Meet. Fédération Internationale de Motocyclisme (FIM) and the Fédération Internationale du Sport Automobile (FISA) have licensed the club for races up to Formula Three for cars and all classes for motorcycles. The club also has a dirt track for autocross events.

JKDR SPORTS
JKDR SPORTS is a multi-sport club to motivate players in rural area in and around Sengadu village. Players from Tiruvallur and Sriperumbudur can utilize this club. The sport center aims to deliver more training, sport and physical activity opportunities for all levels of children and adults to help them engage in a healthy lifestyle. Players can play shuttle badminton, table tennis, carrom, chess and use basic gym tools. Tournaments are being conducted every month to cheer the players. Located near Hyundai Hysco - Sengadu.

Marine Fossil Park
Gunduperumbedu, a village in Sriperumbudur Taluk, is known for marine fossils. The age of the fossils found here, are roughly estimated to be between 100 to 300 million years old.

References

External links

A fledgling website about Sriperumbudur taluk
Daily updates from Sri Adikesava Perumal Temple

Cities and towns in Kanchipuram district
Suburbs of Chennai